The Definitive Collection is a double CD compilation album of songs credited to Australian rock band Australian Crawl and the band's lead singer, James Reyne. The album was released in October 2002.
The versions of “Lakeside”, “Unpublished Critics” and “Things Don’t Seem” are all previously unreleased versions.

It follows the Australian Performing Right Association (APRA), naming "Reckless (Don't Be So)" at number nineteen as part of its 75th Anniversary celebrations, compiling the top 30 Australian songs.

A 2DVD set was released under the same title in May 2004. The first disc featured 15 video clips of Australian Crawl songs, two live appearances, two television appearances and a number of extras including a rare recorded performance by Spiff Rouch (the earliest incarnation of Australian Crawl).  The second disc features videos and live recordings of James Reyne, as a solo artist.

Track listing
 CD 1 Australian Crawl
 Downhearted	
 Beautiful People	
 Indisposed	
 The Boys Light Up	
 Hoochie Gucci Fiorucci Mama	
 Love Beats Me Up	
 Oh No Not You Again	
 Errol	
 Daughters Of The Northern Coast	
 Shut Down
 King Sap (And The Princess Sag)	
 Reckless (Don't Be So)
 White Limbo	
 Lakeside 	
 Unpublished Critics 
 Things Don't Seem	
 Louie Louie (Live) 
 Two Can Play	
 My Day At The Beach	

CD 2 James Reyne
 Fall Of Rome	
 Hammerhead	
 Always The Way	
 Motor's Too Fast	
 Heaven On A Stick	
 Rip It Up	
 House Of Cards	
 One More River	
 Harvest Moon	
 Some People	
 Slave	
 Any Day Above Ground	
 Water, Water	
 Way out West (with James Blundell) 
 Motor City (I Get Lost) (credited as Company of Strangers)
 Bug	
 Rainbows Dead End

References

Australian Crawl albums
James Reyne albums
Compilation albums by Australian artists
2002 compilation albums